Dreams are Nuthin' More than Wishes was David Cassidy's third solo album release. It was released in 1973 and produced by Rick Jarrard on Bell Records. It contains some cover versions, including John Sebastian's "Daydream", Peggy Lee's "Fever" and Nilsson's "Puppy Song"—whose lyrics make up the album title. David Cassidy also did his version of the Partridge Family song, "Summer Days".

Unique to this album is the fold out cover and the hand-written cover notes by Cassidy commenting on why he chose each song. The album made #1 on the UK album charts in 1973 and the top 20 in Australia in 1974 during Cassidy's hectic concert tour of the continent.

Track listing
Side One
 "Intro" (Michael H. McDonald)
 "Daydream" (John Sebastian)
 "Sing Me" (Tony Romeo)
 "Bali Ha'i" (Oscar Hammerstein II, Richard Rodgers)
 "Mae" (Gary Montgomery)
 "Fever" (Eddie Cooley, John Davenport)
 "Summer Days" (Tony Romeo)
Side Two
 "The Puppy Song" (Harry Nilsson)
 "Daydreamer" (Terry Dempsey)
 "Some Old Woman" (Shel Silverstein, Bob Gibson)
 "Can't Go Home Again" (Dave Ellingson, David Cassidy, Kim Carnes)
 "Preyin' on My Mind" (Dave Ellingson, David Cassidy, Kim Carnes)
 "Hold on Me" (Michael H. McDonald)

David Cassidy albums
1973 albums
Albums produced by Rick Jarrard
Bell Records albums